Pier D was a pier on the waterfront of Vancouver, Canada, built by the Canadian Pacific Railway. It was extended in 1916, with CPR committing $700,000 to the project, including $150,000 in what was described as "the largest piling contract ever given on the Pacific coast".

The pier was burned to the ground on July 27, 1938, with losses assessed at $1,000,000.

References

External links
 Film of the July 27th 1938 fire

Buildings and structures in Vancouver
Burned buildings and structures in Canada
Piers in Canada
Transport buildings and structures in British Columbia